Mirabella was a women's magazine published from 1989 to 2000.

Mirabella may also refer to:

Geography
 Mirabella Eclano, an Italian municipality in the Province of Avellino
 Mirabella Imbaccari, an Italian municipality in the Province of Catania
 Mirabella Fortress (Peovica), a Croatian fortress located above town of Omiš
 Mirabella Portland, a residential tower in Portland, Oregon
 Gulf of Mirabella, a Greek gulf of the island of Crete
 Passo di Mirabella, an Italian civil parish of the municipality of Mirabella Eclano (AV)

People
 Erin Mirabella (b. 1978), American cyclist
 Grace Mirabella (1929–2021), American journalist
 Michele Mirabella (b. 1943), Italian TV and radio presenter
 Paul Mirabella (b. 1954), American  baseball player
 Roberto Mirabella (b. 1966), Argentine politician
 Sophie Mirabella (b. 1968), Australian politician
 Vincenzo Mirabella (1570–1624), Italian archaeologist, historian and architect

Television 
 Mirabella (TV series), a 2014 Philippine drama

Other
 Mirabella V, a sloop rigged super yacht
 Mirabella (plant), a genus of cactus
 Mirabella minensis, a cactus species 
 Mirabella (planthopper), an insect genus in the Delphacini
 Stigmella mirabella, a moth species found in the Amur and Primorye regions of Russia

See also
 Mirabelle plum, a fruit of the Mirabelle prune tree
 Mirabel (disambiguation)
 Mirabello (disambiguation)